The Fangoria Blood Drive was a short-form horror film contest created by Fangoria and Koch Vision. The winners of the contest had their films released on a DVD compilation hosted by a genre celebrity. Fangoria: Blood Drive (2004) was hosted by rock star turned filmmaker Rob Zombie. Fangoria: Blood Drive II (2005) was hosted by MuchMusic VJ Mistress Juliya.

Fangoria: Blood Drive (2004) Winners

Note: This iteration alone included specific awards for each entry.
 Mr. Eryams by BC Furtney (Best Film)
 A Man and His Finger by Patrick Rea and Ryan Jones (Best Comedy)
 Disturbances by Patrick Rea (Most Frightening)
 The Hitch by Drew Rist (Palm d'Gore).
 Inside by Christopher P. Garetano (Best Avant Garde Horror)
 Song of the Dead by Chip Gubera (Best Musical)
 Shadows of the Dead by Joel Robertson (Best Editing)
 Specimen (Honorable Mention for Achievement in Special Effects) Not included on the DVD.

Fangoria: Blood Drive II (2005) Winners

 Disposer by BC Furtney
 The Gibbering Horror of Howard Ghormley by Steve Daniels
 The Journal of Edmond Deyers by William Rot
 Mainstream by Adam Barnick
 Means to an End by Paul Solet and Jake Hamilton
 Sawbones by Brad Palmer
 We All Fall Down by Jake Kennedy
 Working Stiff by Erik A. Candiani

Fangoria: Blood Drive Collection (2005)

This DVD contains all the films from both volumes.

References

External links
 Official Website

Short film festivals in the United States
Defunct film festivals in the United States
Fangoria